Aeroflot Flight 5484 ( Reys 5484 Aeroflota) was a scheduled domestic passenger flight from Odessa to Kazan with a stopover in Kyiv that experienced loss of control followed by breaking up in the air on 29 August 1979 over the Tambov Oblast, killing all 63 people on board. It remains the deadliest Tu-124 crash and regular passenger services with the Tu-124 were permanently suspended after the accident, but the Tu-124 was still used by the Soviet military after the accident.

Aircraft and crew 
The aircraft involved in the accident was a Tupolev Tu-124V powered by two Soloviev D-20P engines, registered as СССР-45038 to the Privolzhsk Civil Aviation Directorate of Aeroflot. At the time of the accident, the aircraft had flown 23,232 flight hours and sustained 18,369 pressurization cycles. The five crew members that were aboard the flight consisted of a captain, co-pilot, navigator, flight engineer and one flight attendant.

Synopsis 
Flight 5484 departed from the stopover at Kyiv-Boryspil Airport on August 28 at 23:21 Moscow time (22:21 local time) with five crew members and 58 passengers aboard, including five children. At 00:23 the flight contacted Penza air traffic control to report entering their airspace. That was the last time the flight made contact with controllers.

The crew immediately noticed the aircraft began to lose altitude and they switched off the autopilot at 00:24:43. The flaps did not retract and the position of the flaps led to the aircraft descending quickly; the crew pulled on the control column in attempt to level the aircraft, which levelled briefly before the aircraft went into a roll.

The wreckage of the crash was found at 07:40 Moscow time in the town of Inokovka, on the floodplains of the Vorona River in Tambov Oblast in the Russian SFSR. All 63 passengers and crew were killed in the accident, which remains the deadliest Tu-124 crash in aviation history.

Conclusions 
The exact reason for the flaps being released at cruising altitude was not discovered because major portions of the flap control system were not found among the wreckage. The board did speculate several possible causes but produced no definitive cause for the release of the flaps in the first place. Possible causes were as described:
 It was possible that the pilot in command accidentally threw the switch to release the flaps without realizing it. Tests of the lock on that switch showed that accidentally activating it was indeed possible.
 Electrical malfunction of the signals in the flap control system; investigators speculated if it is possible that a signal from a nearby wire could have activated it, but not quickly, and such issue would not have been detected by mechanics. However, six Tu-124 aircraft with identical flap control systems were examined to test this hypothesis but all the tests showed the flap control system to be in safe working order.
It is also unknown why the crew weakened their grip on the control column at 00:25:13, which led to the aircraft going into a sharp rate of descent. Possible reasons for this include:
 The crew could have diverted their attention towards other tasks in the cockpit, ex. changing engine power, attempting to adjust the flaps, checking the position of the spoilers, etc.;
 Overload and overspeed on the control column;
 The overload from the rate of descent limiting the crew's capability to apply sufficient force;
 any combination of the above factors.

Aftermath 
The Tupolev Tu-124 was withdrawn from regular passenger service in the USSR, but was still used by the Soviet military. The design and placement of the switch to release the flaps was changed to prevent accidental activation of the flaps.

References  

Aviation accidents and incidents in 1979
Aviation accidents and incidents in the Soviet Union
5484
1979 in the Soviet Union
Accidents and incidents involving the Tupolev Tu-124
August 1979 events in Europe
Airliner accidents and incidents with an unknown cause
Airliner accidents and incidents caused by design or manufacturing errors
Airliner accidents and incidents caused by instrument failure
Transport in Tambov Oblast